Predrag Đorđević (also transliterated Predrag Djordjević; born 4 August 1972) is a Serbian former professional footballer.

Known for his set pieces, Đorđević played as a left midfielder for Greek club Olympiacos for 13 years, becoming Olympiacos' greatest foreign goalscorer, averaging a goal every three league matches, as well as becoming a symbol of Olympiacos' "Golden Age" of 12 championship trophies in 13 years. Đorđević is acknowledged as one of the greatest foreign players to have played in Greece. Đorđević also played for the national team of Serbia and Montenegro (formerly FR Yugoslavia), amassing 37 caps and 1 goal. He featured for his country in the 2006 FIFA World Cup.

Club career

Early career
Having started his career in the youth section of Radnički Kragujevac, Đorđević's talent was spotted by Red Star Belgrade scouts who signed him and then loaned him to Spartak Subotica. Đorđević first moved to Greece to play for third division Paniliakos in December 1992. He was an instrumental figure as the Pyrgos club achieved successive promotions. Đorđević made his debut in the Greek Championship on 27 August 1995.

Olympiacos
Đorđević came to Olympiacos from Paniliakos together with Stelios Giannakopoulos in 1996. Dušan Bajević signed him for Olympiacos in the summer of 1996, leaving A.E.K. The Serbian established himself as the club's dead-ball specialist, penalty taker and leader. He formed, along with Grigoris Georgatos, an outstanding left wing for Olympiacos in 1998–99 and they were the catalytic factor for Olympiacos qualifying to the UEFA Champions League 1998–99 quarter-finals. He scored 50 goals in his first five seasons at Olympiacos, all of which brought titles. Another superlative season in red and white followed in 2002–03, Đorđević scoring 14 league goals and providing 15 assists. He also hit form in the UEFA Champions League, scoring four goals in six games which included a hat-trick against Bayer Leverkusen (6–2). In 2003–04, Đorđević recorded 10 goals and 22 assists and was voted the best foreign player in the Greek ever Alpha Ethniki.

In 2004–05, he missed his club's first three Champions League matches through injury, but returned to score the winning goal against Deportivo La Coruña. He captained his side in all four UEFA Cup matches, scoring against Newcastle United. He led his side to the domestic double, appearing in 25 league matches, scoring five goals and providing six assists, before signing a two-year contract extension.

Amazingly, 2005–06 was then 34-year-old Đorđević's most productive season, only missing one game in the Greek National A division, leading the club's scoring charts with 15 goals and reaching a total of 110 in the competition. The icing on the cake was his appearance that summer in 2006 FIFA World Cup.

Another important period for Đorđević, the 2006–07 season, would prove record breaking. Once again, scoring crucial goals for his club, Đorđević not only continued his goal streak against Olympiacos' rivals AEK Athens, but also added another League trophy to the club's vast collection. Along with Georgios Anatolakis, this would be the captain's 10th championship, making him the only foreign player in Greece to achieve such a feat.

The 2007–08 season proved once again to be successful for the Olympiacos captain as he led a very new looking squad out to UEFA Champions League glory. Defeating the likes of Werder Bremen and Lazio, Olympiacos finished with the same points as group leaders Real Madrid and recorded their first Champions League away win in history. Đorđević played a vital role in the Greek club's entry into the knockout rounds for the second time in their history, finishing the group stages with four assists, first in the tournament. As a result of his excellent form in both Europe and the Greek Superleague, Đorđević who was set to retire at the end of the 2008 season, extended his contract for another year.

On 30 March 2009, Đorđević announced that he had decided to end his career as a football player by the end of the season 2008–09, having spent 13 years of his 20 years as a professional footballer playing for Olympiacos.

International career
Đorđević made his international debut for the then FR Yugoslavia against Switzerland in a September 1998. He featured in qualifying for UEFA Euro 2000, but did not make the squad for the finals. Also appeared on the road to UEFA Euro 2004, although Serbia and Montenegro did not qualify for Portugal, and remained a key part of their 2006 FIFA World Cup qualifying side. Đorđević played every minute in Serbia and Montenegro's failed World Cup campaign, losing each match in their Group C encounters with Argentina, Netherlands, and Ivory Coast.

Personal life
He is married to a woman of Greek descent from Pyrgos, the first town in Greece he has ever lived and played at. He has both Serbian and Greek citizenship.

Career statistics

Club

International

Honours

Club
Paniliakos
Beta Ethniki: 1994–95
Gamma Ethniki: 1993–94

Olympiacos
Alpha Ethniki/Super League Greece (12): 1996–97, 1997–98, 1998–99, 1999–2000, 2000–01, 2001–02, 2002–03, 2004–05, 2005–06, 2006–07, 2007–08, 2008–09
Greek Cup (5): 1998–99, 2004–05, 2005–06, 2007–08, 2008–09; runner-up: 2000–01, 2001–02, 2003–04

Individual
Greek Championship Foreign Footballer of the Year: 2000–01, 2001–02, 2002–03
Olympiacos Golden Eleven

References

External links
 
 
 
 
 

1972 births
Living people
Sportspeople from Kragujevac
Serbian footballers
2006 FIFA World Cup players
Expatriate footballers in Greece
Association football midfielders
Serbia and Montenegro footballers
Serbia and Montenegro international footballers
Greek people of Serbian descent
FK Spartak Subotica players
Olympiacos F.C. players
Paniliakos F.C. players
Yugoslav footballers
Red Star Belgrade footballers
Super League Greece players
FK Radnički 1923 players
Serbia and Montenegro expatriate footballers
Serbia and Montenegro expatriate sportspeople in Greece
Serbian expatriate sportspeople in Greece